Yuriy Stepanovich Konovalov (born 3 February 1970) is a former Russian professional footballer.

Club career
He made his professional debut in the Soviet Second League B in 1990 for FC Zenit Chelyabinsk.

He made his Russian Premier League debut for FC Rotor Volgograd on 9 July 1992 in a game against FC Krylia Sovetov Samara and spent 5 seasons in the RPL with Rotor, FC Lokomotiv Nizhny Novgorod and FC Energiya-Tekstilshchik Kamyshin.

Personal life
He is a brother of Andrei Konovalov.

References

1970 births
Sportspeople from Chelyabinsk
Living people
Soviet footballers
Russian footballers
Association football forwards
FC Rotor Volgograd players
Russian Premier League players
FC Lokomotiv Nizhny Novgorod players
FC Tekstilshchik Kamyshin players
FC Energiya Volzhsky players
FC Tom Tomsk players
FC Neftyanik Ufa players
FC Torpedo Miass players
FC Nosta Novotroitsk players